The Department of Water and Environmental Regulation was formed on 1 July 2017, when the Department of Environment Regulation (DER) amalgamated with the Department of Water and the Office of the Environmental Protection Authority. It is responsible for looking after the environment and the regulation of water resources in the state of Western Australia. 

The department provides services to the Environmental Protection Authority, and support to Keep Australia Beautiful Council WA, the Waste Authority of Western Australia, the Office of the Appeals Convenor, the Cockburn Sound Management Council and the Contaminated Sites Committee.

In May 2021, the department was one of eight Western Australian Government departments to receive a new Director General with Michelle Andrews being appointed to the role effective from 31 May 2021.

References

External links
 

2017 establishments in Australia
Western Australia
Environmental agencies in Australia
Government departments of Western Australia
Government agencies established in 2017
Western Australia